The Melancholy Connection is a compilation album with a bonus DVD by Swedish punk rock band Millencolin, released in 2012. It follows up The Melancholy Collection which also contained rare and unreleased tracks. The DVD features a documentary that looks inside the making of Pennybridge Pioneers, with archival footage of the band and Bad Religion/Epitaph founder Brett Gurewitz who produced Pennybridge Pioneers and played acoustic guitar on "The Ballad".

The compilation contains the two newly recorded tracks "Carry You" and "Out from Nowhere".

Punk News began streaming the album in its entirety on 23 May 2012.

Track listing

A Pennybridge Production 
The CD is paired with a 90-minute DVD that takes fans inside the making of Pennybridge Pioneers with never before seen archival footage, interviews with the band, and live performance in Cologne, Germany.

Track listing 
Intro	
Hollywood	
Material Boy (Live)	
Duck Pond (Live)	
Recording	
Hellman (Live)	
Drums	
Highway Donkey (Live)	
Stop to Think (Live)
Guitars	
Right About Now (Live)	
Working Titles	
A-Ten (Live)	
Vocals	
Devil's Me (Live)	
Penguin Vocals	
Penguins Video Shoot	
Penguins and Polarbears Video
Backups	
The Mayfly (Live)	
Checkmate	
Pepper (Live)	
Fox Video Shoot	
Fox Video	
One More	
The Ballad (Live)

Bonus
No Cigar (Live)
Fox (Live)
Penguins and Polarbears (Live)

References 

Millencolin albums
2012 compilation albums
Epitaph Records albums
Burning Heart Records albums